"Got No Shame" is a song by American hard rock band Brother Cane, appearing on the band's self-titled debut. The song was released as the album's debut single and is the first single Brother Cane ever released. "Got No Shame" features a mixture of hard rock and southern rock with harmonica throughout the song, which was played by Topper Price.

"Got No Shame" peaked at #2 on the Billboard Mainstream Rock chart on September 18, 1993, being kept from the #1 spot by Cry of Love's "Piece Pipe".

Music video
A music video was created for the song and was directed by Carlos Grasso.

Personnel
Brother Cane
 Damon Johnson – vocals, guitar
 Roman Glick – guitar
 Glenn Maxey – bass
 Scott Collier – drums, cowbell

Additional musicians
 Topper Price – harmonica

Charts

References

1993 songs
1993 singles
Brother Cane songs
Virgin Records singles
Songs written by Damon Johnson
Songs written by Marti Frederiksen